Brazoria may refer to:

 Brazoria County, Texas
 Brazoria, Texas, a town in Brazoria County
 Brazoria (plant), a plant genus in the family Lamiaceae